Aleksandar Leposavić (born 3 November 1987) is a Serbian football forward.

References

External links
 
 Aleksandar Leposavić stats at utakmica.rs 
 

1987 births
Living people
People from Ivanjica
Association football forwards
Serbian footballers
FK Javor Ivanjica players
FK Jedinstvo Užice players
FK Sloboda Užice players
Serbian SuperLiga players